The 2007 Wychavon District Council election took place on 3 May 2007 to elect members of Wychavon District Council in Worcestershire, England. The whole council was up for election and the Conservative party stayed in overall control of the council.

Background
Before the election the Conservatives controlled the council with 31 councillors, compared to 12 for the Liberal Democrats and 2 for Labour. A total of 96 candidates stood for election including the first UK Independence Party candidate for Wychavon District Council in Evesham South, however the Conservative leader of the council, Martin Jennings was among those who stood down from the council at the election. One seat in Pinvin had no election in 2007 as the Liberal Democrat councillor Liz Tucker was re-elected without opposition.

Election result
The Conservatives increased their majority on the council by four seats to have 35 of the 45 councillors on the council. This came at the expense of Labour, who lost their only two seats on the council in Droitwich West to the Conservatives, and the Liberal Democrats who had a net loss of two seats to finish with 10 councillors. Overall turnout at the election was 42.42%, an increase from 37.94% at the 2003 election.

Apart from the gains from Labour in Droitwich West, Conservative gains included taking seats from the Liberal Democrats in Honeybourne and Pebworth, Badsey and Little Hampton. However the Liberal Democrats did also gain seats in Droitwich South West and The Littletons from the Conservatives, with Alan Anderson taking The Littletons with a five-vote majority over independent Richard Lasota.

Ward results

By-elections between 2007 and 2011

Lovett and North Claines
A by-election was held in Lovett and North Claines on 13 December 2007 after the death of Conservative councillor Paul Coley. The seat was held for the Conservatives by Tony Miller with a majority of 495 votes over Liberal Democrat John Garbett.

Droitwich Central
A by-election was held in Droitwich Central on 16 July 2009 after the death of Liberal Democrat councillor Graham Gopsill. The seat was held for the Liberal Democrats by his widow Ann Gopsill with a majority of 10 votes over Conservative David Morris.

Droitwich South West
A by-election was held in Droitwich South West on 1 October 2009 after Conservative councillor Yuleen Jewell resigned from the council. The seat was gained for the Liberal Democrats by Stephanie Vale with a majority of 105 votes over Conservative Maureen Lawley.

Evesham South
A by-election was held in Evesham South on 18 February 2010 after the death of Conservative councillor Ron Cartwright. The seat was held for the Conservatives by Gerard O'Donnell with a majority of 182 votes over Liberal Democrat Diana Brown.

References

2007
2007 English local elections